Rebecca Wardell (born 21 December 1977) is a New Zealand athlete who competes in the combined events.

She has competed in the women's heptathlon at the 2006 Commonwealth Games at Melbourne, the 2008 Summer Olympics at Beijing, and the 2010 Commonwealth Games at Delhi

Wardell now works at the International Olympic Committee in the Sports Department.

Competition record

External links 

Living people
1977 births
Olympic athletes of New Zealand
Commonwealth Games competitors for New Zealand
New Zealand heptathletes
Athletes (track and field) at the 2006 Commonwealth Games
Athletes (track and field) at the 2010 Commonwealth Games
Athletes (track and field) at the 2008 Summer Olympics
Competitors at the 2005 Summer Universiade
New Zealand female hurdlers